Tallawong railway station, originally known as Cudgegong Road railway station, is a station near the intersection of Cudgegong and Schofield Roads, Tallawong, in Sydney, Australia. The station is the terminus of the Metro North West Line on the Sydney Metro network. Beyond the station lies the Tallawong depot, where all metro rolling stock is stabled.

History 
Though various forms of a rail line to Rouse Hill were proposed by the NSW Government between 1998 and 2010, these generally terminated at Rouse Hill Town Centre. A 2001 plan had the line continue north-west rather than west from Rouse Hill, with the next stop at Box Hill. Tallawong only emerged as a station location in 2012, with the government favouring a future corridor heading west from Rouse Hill towards the existing Schofields railway station and the future growth area of Marsden Park.

The station opened on 26 May 2019 and is operated by Metro Trains Sydney, who are also responsible for the design of the station.

Plans to extend the line to Schofields stations after preceding from Tallawong are still in development.

Naming

The station was originally proposed to be named Cudgegong Road after a nearby road, which in turn was named for a central west NSW property owned by the suburb's namesake, local pastoralist and political figure Richard Rouse. It could not be named Rouse Hill as this name is used for a separate station to the east at Rouse Hill Town Centre.

Blacktown City Council unsuccessfully proposed naming the surrounding area and station in honour of former Prime Minister Gough Whitlam. In December 2017, the Geographical Names Board of New South Wales launched a consultation to rename the station Tallawong. The renaming was confirmed in April 2018. In November 2020, the portion of Rouse Hill in which the station was located became part of the new suburb of Tallawong, named after the station.

Design 
The station was designed by Australian architectural firm Hassell. Its facilities include 1,000 parking spaces and a bicycle shed with 45 spaces.

Services 

Tallawong has one island platform with two faces. It is served by Metro North West Line services. Two bus stops are located adjacent to the station. The "Tallawong Station, Implexa Pde" stop is serviced by two Busways services to Marsden Park and two to Blacktown. The "Implexa Pde opp Tallawong Station" stop is serviced by four Busways services to Rouse Hill.

References

External links 

 Tallawong Station at Sydney Metro (Archived 6 July 2018)
 Tallawong Station at Transport for NSW (Archived 10 June 2019)
 Tallawong at Sydney Metro Northwest Places

Easy Access railway stations in Sydney
Railway stations in Australia opened in 2019
Sydney Metro stations
City of Blacktown